Cool City Production Vol. 4 "Mai-K" Feel Fine!" is a remix album by Japanese singer and songwriter Mai Kuraki and Japanese production team Cool City Production. It was released on November 23, 2002, by Tent House. The album contains five different remixes of her song "Feel Fine!".

Track listing

Release history

References

2002 remix albums
Mai Kuraki albums
Being Inc. albums